In top-level association football competitions, 23 players have scored 500 or more goals over the course of their career in both club and international football, according to research by the , first published in 2007. Hungarian Imre Schlosser was the first to reach the 500-goal mark, doing so in 1927 shortly before his retirement. Eight players have accomplished the feat at a single club, among them Josef Bican (Slavia Prague), Jimmy Jones (Glenavon), Jimmy McGrory (Celtic), Lionel Messi (Barcelona), Gerd Müller (Bayern Munich), Pelé (Santos), Fernando Peyroteo (Sporting CP), and Uwe Seeler (Hamburg). Of these eight, Messi scored the most, with 672 goals between his debut in 2004 and his departure in 2021.

UEFA, the governing body for European football, ranks him as the leading all-time goalscorer in European top-flight leagues with 518 goals, narrowly ahead of Hungarian Ferenc Puskás. The RSSSF credits Bican with 948 goals, a tally which includes goals scored in winter tournaments, as well as when selected to represent regional and city teams, and the Football Association of the Czech Republic claims a total of 821. Spanish newspapers Marca and Sport state that both Bican and Pelé scored 762 goals. Such is the difficulty for statisticians and media outlets to determine which goals to include that the topic has spurred controversy; Bican once walked out of a gala held in his honour by the IFFHS after the organisation had excluded war-time goals from his tally, although it later recognised 229 goals he had scored during the period.

Media outlets around the world such as Sky Sports, ESPN, and Globo Esporte argue that, for Brazilian forward Pelé and players of his era, friendly matches were highly important fixtures and held more resonance, and the tallies accumulated should be included, while journalist Hugh McIlvanney once described them as mere "profit-making excursions" that bore little "relevance to Pelé's reality as a great player", and Jonathan Liew stated that many of the friendlies were "against up-country teams or down-at-heel invitational sides". When Argentinian forward Messi was reported to have broken the record for most goals for a single club (644 for Spanish club Barcelona), Pelé's former club Santos denied the claim, releasing a statement saying 448 of Pelé's goals scored in friendlies had been uncounted, and arguing that many of the goals came against "the best teams of all time", statements Pelé agreed with by publicly changing his overall tally to 1,283 on Instagram. When reporting the statistics of Messi, Barcelona argued that because Bican and Pelé, as well as Erwin Helmchen and Abe Lenstra, among others, scored the majority of their goals in leagues which were not played at a national level, their tallies should be questioned and potentially not counted, while goals scored during war-time, in lower-tiers and regional divisions, by players such as Bican, Ferenc Deák, Puskás, Seeler, Muller, Túlio Maravilha, and Robert Lewandowski, are also questioned.

In 2021, Portuguese forward Cristiano Ronaldo was reported to have broken the record when he scored his 760th goal, although it was widely acknowledged it was impossible to quantify with certainty as statistics from previous generations are often disputed, as highlighted by football journalist Jonathan Wilson and Italian newspaper Corriere dello Sport's editor Ivan Zazzaroni, who recognised the possibility that German striker Helmchen had scored a purported 981 goals. Ronaldo himself addressed the issue, saying that "the world has changed since then and football has changed as well, but this doesn't mean that we can just erase history according to our interests". There are other claims to the record; the Guinness World Records credits Pelé as the scorer of the "most career goals", with 1,279, and Brazilian striker Romário celebrated scoring what he claimed was his 1,000th goal in 2007 but later admitted his tally included friendly matches; they are reported to have scored 767 and 772 goals, respectively, with Pelé's total including one goal for the military team and nine goals for the state team of São Paulo at the State Team Championship. The Encyclopædia Britannica notes that Brazilian Arthur Friedenreich is "officially recognised" by FIFA to have scored 1,329 goals, although there is little evidence for, and no documentation of, this claim. In March 2022, Ronaldo surpassed Bican's purported tally of 805.

Footballers with 500 or more goals

According to the IFFHS and other media outlets, 23 players are credited with scoring 500 or more goals in top-level professional football competitions: 

Bold indicates players currently active.
 * indicates player has scored at least 500 goals for a single club.

RSSSF statistics
As the RSSSF uses different methodology from that of the IFFHS and other media outlets to determine which goals to include, 72 players are credited with scoring 500 or more goals in matches taking into account competitions at all levels:

Bold indicates players currently active.
+ indicates number is a lower bound - player may have scored more.

See also 
 List of top international men's football goalscorers by country
 List of men's footballers with 100 or more international caps
 List of men's footballers with 50 or more international goals
 List of men's footballers with the most official appearances
 List of footballers who achieved hat-trick records
 List of world association football records
 List of goalscoring goalkeepers
 Lists of hat-tricks in football

References

Notes

Association football records and statistics
Lists of association football players
Career achievements of association football players